The Rajnandgaon ambush occurred on 12 July 2009, when around 29 members of the Indian Police were killed in three connected attacks by Maoist naxalite rebels in Rajnandgaon,  from Raipur (India's Chhattisgarh state).

Incident
In the morning of 12 July 2009, Vinod Kumar Chaubey who was the Superintendent of Police of Rajnandgaon district received a message about a naxalite attack in Madanwada that had killed two policemen. Chaubey travelled to the spot with reinforcements, and was attacked along the way. The rebels lay in ambush along a stretch of the road where they had placed land mines. All in all, at least 29 policemen were killed, including Chaubey.

Chaubey was posthumously awarded the Kirti Chakra award for gallantry, by the President of India.

The Rajnandgaon ambush is one of the most serious attacks carried out by the naxalite rebels in Chhattisgarh.

See also

Timeline of the Naxalite–Maoist insurgency

References 

2009 in India
Communist Party of India (Maoist)
Conflicts in 2009
Naxalite–Maoist insurgency
Crime in Chhattisgarh
Rajnandgaon district
Ambushes
July 2009 events in India
2009 murders in India
Rajnandgaon